LFO (an acronym for Lyte Funkie Ones) were an American pop and hip hop band consisting of singers Devin Lima (born Harold Lima; March 18, 1977 – November 21, 2018), Brad Fischetti (born September 11, 1975), and Rich Cronin (August 30, 1974 – September 8, 2010). Before Lima joined the group in 1999, the third member was Brian Gillis (known as "Brizz"), who was with the group from its start in 1995; the group disbanded after Cronin's death in 2010 but briefly reunited (with Fischetti and Lima as a duo) in 2017 before Lima's own death a year later. Their single "Summer Girls" reached number 3 on the Billboard charts, and the band has sold over four million records worldwide.

History

Origins and Gillis's departure (1995–1998)
In 1995,  New Bedford, Massachusetts, Rich Cronin and Brad Fischetti met Brian "Brizz" Gillis. LFO had marginal success with the remake of the Yvonne Elliman song "If I Can't Have You", which missed the Top 40, reaching No. 54 on the UK Singles Chart. In 1997, they released a cover of the 1990 New Kids on the Block hit "Step By Step" as a single.

In 1999, Gillis was frustrated with the lack of progress that the group had made so he left to pursue a solo career, which led him to multiple college tours and a job in the music industry, with a radio promotion position in Florida with BMG.

Lima's arrival
After Gillis left, Fischetti and Cronin still wanted to continue to pursue their dreams of making it big, so they headed back to the United States and had an open audition. Devin Lima, an employee of a hardware store at the time, was chosen in place of Gillis. Lima decided the group should go by the initials LFO rather than Lyte Funkie Ones.

In the UK, however, they were unable to use the abbreviated name of LFO due to an IDM act on the Warp Records label who had been using the name since 1988.

Still signed with Trans Continental and now with Arista Records, LFO recorded some new material with Dow Brain, Brad Young and Danny Wood of New Kids on the Block, at Underground Studios' second location; the basement of a 200+ year old house in Needham, Massachusetts.

Wood had been a long-time friend of original member Brian Gillis. Among the songs LFO had recorded in an attempt to make a demo, was a track entitled "Summer Girls" (produced by Dow Brain and Brad Young of Underground Productions). 

This song, "Summer Girls" made its way to the Top 10, eventually reaching the number 3 position on the Billboard Hot 100, and the number 1 position on the Billboard single sales chart.

New York City radio station Z100 (WHTZ 100.3FM-MHZ), also helped LFO's popularity through frequent promotion and airings of the song "Summer Girls" before the song's national Top 10 status.

Self-titled debut album
Their debut album, LFO, sold over 2.5 million copies worldwide, with two Top 10 hits on the Billboard Hot 100; "Summer Girls" and "Girl on TV". In 1999, "Summer Girls" was nominated for a Billboard Music Award for Top Selling Single of the Year; the song sold over 1.5 million copies in the US. The song itself contained numerous non sequiturs, such as "you're the best girl that I ever did see/the great Larry Bird, jersey 33" and "fell deep in love, but now we ain't speakin'/Michael J. Fox was Alex P. Keaton". 

This album featured many vocals from original member Brian. The label loved the original versions of the records, they left all of the vocals from Brian, including his lead on "Can't Have You". The group was a part of a show called LFO Live from Orlando (1999).

The year 2000 was a busy year for LFO, featuring tours,  with over 230 concerts. They also served as opening act for Britney Spears, and co-headlined Nickelodeon's All That Music & More summer tour. They also found success in the UK at the same time when second single, the Dow Brain and Brad Young co-written "Girl on TV", entered the UK chart at #6. In 2000, the band won the Nickelodeon Kids' Choice Award for Favorite Group of the Year. Play Along Toys made dolls of the group in 2001.

Life Is Good and first split (2000–2002)
They appeared on The Amanda Show as guest stars, singing a song while Amanda danced in the background with the show's signature "dancing lobsters". At the end, LFO described Amanda as "the most beautiful girl in the world".

In the summer of 2001, the group released their sophomore and final album, Life Is Good, with the release of only two singles "Life Is Good" and "Every Other Time", which was the only commercial release from the album. 

After lackluster record sales of the album and the late-1990s/early-2000s boyband trend nearing its end, LFO parted ways in February 2002.

Post-breakup
In an attempt to form a pop group without it being labeled as a boy band, Cronin founded Bad Mood Mike in 2003.  The project failed, as it never produced an album, and ended after a few months. Cronin was later in a group called Loose Cannons, with  Doug Ray. He was also part of the TV show, Mission: Man Band, which aired on VH1.

In March 2005, Cronin sought treatment for constant headaches, and was diagnosed with leukemia. He underwent chemotherapy in Boston, and by January 2006, his leukemia was in remission. In 2008, Cronin launched his first solo-studio album  entitled, Billion Dollar Sound.

Lima released his first solo track back in 2006, it being a cover of the  Sly & the Family Stone  song, “If You Want Me to Stay” for the tribute album Different Strokes by Different Folks. This led to him performing  as part of a tribute to Sly Stone, on the 2006 Grammy Awards, alongside Steven Tyler and Joe Perry of Aerosmith, Maroon 5, Joss Stone, John Legend and will.i.am.

Lima, along with his new band The Cadbury Diesel, released their debut record, Mozart Popart in July 2008. The release was more rock-oriented with songs such as, “Hangin’ With You” and the soulful R&B tune “Me Veda". Cadbury Diesel performed a song entitled "Rocky Road" for the film, American Pie Presents Beta House (2007).  Lima later performed music under the alias Live From Orlando. 

In late 2013, Lima formed a group with electronic artists DJ Shakka and Ayj as The Mack Pack, releasing two singles in 2014, "Golden" and "Out of Control" (including a video).  The group later changed its name to Rogue Cherry with the addition of Alexandra Foster which produced a post mortem album, Harold Lima: Rockwell.

Brad Fischetti has since become an anti-abortion activist. During a 2012 religious group protest he was live tweeting from outside an abortion clinic. Included in his tweets were the doctor's name, and apparent quote from a nurse claiming financial motives for the services offered there. In a statement to E! News, Fischetti denied harassing any women outside the clinic, but adamantly stood by his views and said he regrets not speaking out more when LFO was at the height of its fame. He is also the music director for a church.

Fischetti and Lima collaborated on a new hip-hop project called The Xiles. They released the two-song Xiles X-mas EP on December 13, 2009, and revealed that they’d already begun recording their debut album, American Genie: Volume 1.

Reunion and second split (2009–2010)
On June 3, 2009, LFO posted a blog entitled "LFO is Back" on their unofficial MySpace page which announced that they had reunited and were going on the Malcolm Douglas Tribute tour beginning September 23, 2009, with Rookie of the Year, Go Crash Audio, and Kiernan McMullan. A new song titled "Summer of My Life" was also announced in association with the reunion.

However, the reunion was short-lived. On September 28, 2009, LFO announced through their YouTube page LFOVIDEOS that they had permanently disbanded. They never had a chance to record a third studio album due to Cronin's death. The individual members of the band planned to continue making music with their various side projects. Rich Cronin died, at the Brigham and Women's Hospital in Boston, Massachusetts on September 8, 2010, after battling leukemia. He was 36.

Reunion, new single, and third split (2017–2018)
In July 2017, LFO released their first new song after 15 years, titled "Perfect 10". It featured then-surviving members Lima and Fischetti, with Fischetti telling Entertainment Weekly that "We're sincerely thankful and excited to have the opportunity to create new music and tour again. We miss the presence of our late great brother bandmate Rich Cronin. We will do our best to make him proud, carry on his legacy, and to usher LFO into the future."

In October 2017, Devin Lima was diagnosed with stage four adrenal cancer and had one kidney removed. The news was confirmed by Fischetti. Lima died of his cancer on November 21, 2018, at age 41.

O-Town Reunion, Y2K Tour (2019–2020)
The final living member Brad Fischetti began touring with pop group O-Town in a series of dates during the Y2K tour. He performed LFO songs in memory of Rich and Devin and vowed to keep the LFO legacy alive.

Former members
 Rich Cronin (1995–2002, 2009; died 2010)
 Brad Fischetti (1995–2002, 2009, 2017–2018)
 Brian Gillis (1995–1999)
 Devin Lima (1999–2002, 2009, 2017–2018; died 2018)

Discography

Albums

Singles

Music videos

Notes

 A  "(Sex U Up) The Way You Like It" did not enter the Billboard Hot 100, but peaked at number 3 on the Bubbling Under Hot 100 Singles chart, which acts as a 25-song extension to the Hot 100.

References

External links

 How "Summer Girls" Explains a Bunch of Hits—and the Music of 1999

American boy bands
American pop music groups
Vocal trios
Pop-rap groups
Musical groups established in 1995
Musical groups disestablished in 2002
Musical groups reestablished in 2009
Musical groups disestablished in 2010
Musical groups reestablished in 2017
Musical groups disestablished in 2018
Arista Records artists
J Records artists